Jagannathbati  is a village in Chanditala II community development block of Srirampore subdivision in Hooghly district in the Indian state of West Bengal.

Geography
Chanditala police station serves this Village.

Gram panchayat
Villages and census towns in Janai gram panchayat are: Jagannathbati and Janai.

Demographics
As per 2011 Census of India, Jagannathbati had a total population of 1,846 of which 829 (45%) were males and 1,017 (55%) were females. Population below 6 years was 234. The total number of literates in Jagannathbati was 1,387 (86.04% of the population over 6 years).

Transport
The nearest railway station is  Janai Road railway station on the Howrah-Bardhaman chord line, which is a part of the Kolkata Suburban Railway system.

The main road is State Highway 15. It is the main artery of the town and it is connected to NH-19 (old number NH 2)/ Durgapur Expressway.

References 

Villages in Chanditala II CD Block